César Miguel Rebosio Compans (born 20 October 1976, in Lima) is a Peruvian retired footballer who played as a defender.

Club career
Rebosio played for five different teams in his country (namely twice for Sporting Cristal and Sport Boys), and also had abroad stints with Greece's PAOK F.C. (only three matches) and Real Zaragoza and UD Almería in Spain.

With the Aragonese, he was regularly used during his three 1/2 years, helping the side to the 2003–04 Copa del Rey, one year after promoting to La Liga. He finished his spell in the country also in the second division, with UD Almería.

International career
Rebosio was a member of the national team, and played 60 matches since his debut on 12 June 1997, featuring in three Copa América tournaments.

References

External links
 
 

1976 births
Living people
Footballers from Lima
Peruvian people of Italian descent
Peruvian people of Spanish descent
Peruvian footballers
Association football defenders
Sporting Cristal footballers
Real Zaragoza players
UD Almería players
Club Alianza Lima footballers
Sport Boys footballers
PAOK FC players
Club Deportivo Universidad César Vallejo footballers
Peruvian Primera División players
La Liga players
Segunda División players
Super League Greece players
Peru international footballers
1997 Copa América players
1999 Copa América players
2000 CONCACAF Gold Cup players
2004 Copa América players
Peruvian expatriate footballers
Expatriate footballers in Spain
Expatriate footballers in Greece